Euophrys albopalpalis is a species of jumping spiders found only in central Taiwan. It is a tiny spider with a total length (excluding legs) of less than 3 mm. The sparsely hairy carapace is dark brown with black margins and a black w-shaped mark about halfway along the back. The legs are dark brown and marked with yellowish-brown rings. The oval abdomen is marked dorsally with two light triangular markings followed by four light curved lines.

The main distinguishing feature between this species and the similar Euophrys nepalica is the presence of dense white hairs on the palps.

References

Salticidae
Spiders described in 2002
Spiders of Taiwan